Rodney Slack (born 1940) is an English former professional footballer who played as a goalkeeper for Cambridge United from 1962 to 1970.

References

1940 births
Living people
English footballers
Association football goalkeepers
Cambridge United F.C. players
Bury Town F.C. players